Venom Games Limited was a British video game developer based in Gateshead, England. The studio was established by Peter Johnson in 2003 and succeeded Rage Newcastle. Take-Two Interactive acquired the company in 2004, where it became part of the 2K label in 2005 and was closed down in July 2008.

History 
Venom Games was established in 2003 as successor to the previously closed Rage Newcastle, a studio of Rage Games, and headed by Peter Johnson as studio head. In 2004, the company was acquired by Take-Two Interactive. The deal's negotiations were handled by law firm Weightmans. On 25 January 2005, Take-Two Interactive announced the opening of publishing label 2K, which would henceforth manage their development studios, including Venom Games.

On 2 July 2008, employees of Venom Games were informed that the company was due to close at the end of the month. Take-Two Interactive confirmed that they were "assessing the role of Venom Games" and considering "possible redundancies", though no final decision would be made "until after the consultation with employees". Venom Games still shut down that year.

Games developed

References 

2K (company)
Defunct companies based in Tyne and Wear
Defunct video game companies of the United Kingdom
Take-Two Interactive divisions and subsidiaries
Video game companies disestablished in 2008
Video game companies established in 2003
Video game development companies